Jacques Charles Émile Jouguet (5 January 1871, in Bessèges (Gard) – 2 April 1943, in Montpellier) was a French engineer and scientist, whose name is attached to the Chapman–Jouguet condition.

He was the son of Félix Jouguet (1831–1887), mining engineer and mayor of Bessèges.

A graduate of l'École polytechnique (ranked third in the class of 1889) and of the l'École des mines de Paris (ranked first in the class of 1895), he worked as an engineer in the Corps des mines from 1895 to 1898. He was a professor at l'École des mines de Saint-Étienne from 1898 to 1907. Émile Jouguet is known primarily for his work in thermodynamics and hydrodynamics, applied to heat engines and explosives, and also for his work on shock waves.

In 1910 in Paris he was appointed chief engineer of the control of railroads. He was responsible for developing a comprehensive system of operations and signalling used throughout the rail network in France. From 1910 to 1914 and from 1920 to 1939, he was a professor at l'École des mines de Paris; during World War I he was a lieutenant-colonel of artillery.

In 1921 Jouguet won the Poncelet Prize. In 1930, he was elected as a member of l'Académie des sciences, and in 1936 he was honored with the rank of commandeur de la légion d'honneur.

Books by Jouguet
 
  (1924, new edition with notes and additions)

References 

This article incorporates information from the corresponding article in French Wikipedia.

External links
 

1871 births
1943 deaths
Commandeurs of the Légion d'honneur
École Polytechnique alumni
French mining engineers
Members of the French Academy of Sciences
Mines Paris - PSL alumni
People from Gard
French railway civil engineers